Strawbridge v. Curtiss, 7 U.S. (3 Cranch) 267 (1806), was a case in which the Supreme Court of the United States first addressed the question of complete diversity for diversity jurisdiction.

In a 158-word opinion the Court held that for federal diversity jurisdiction, under section 11 of the Judiciary Act of 1789, no party on one side of a suit may be a citizen of the same state as any party on the other side. Therefore, when there are joint plaintiffs or defendants, jurisdiction must be established as to each party. That requirement remains acceptable in law as a matter of statutory interpretation, not constitutional command.

See also
List of United States Supreme Court cases, volume 7

References

External links
 

United States Supreme Court cases
United States Supreme Court cases of the Marshall Court
Diversity jurisdiction case law
1806 in United States case law